Josephine Fock (born 5 September 1965) is a Danish politician, who was a member of the Folketing for The Alternative from 2015 to 2018. She was the leader of the party from 1 February to 14 November 2020 after Uffe Elbæk resigned.

Political career
Born in Aarhus, Fock was elected into parliament at the 2015 Danish general election. In 2018 she was offered a job for the Danish Refugee Council and she resigned her seat in parliament on 1 November 2018. Julius Graakjær Grantzau took over her seat.

On 16 December 2019 the leader of the Alternative, Uffe Elbæk, announced that he would like to pass on the leadership. On 1 February 2020 Fock became the party's new leader. A month later, on 9 March, Uffe Elbæk, Susanne Zimmer, Sikandar Siddique and Rasmus Nordqvist left the party, with Elbæk stating that he "could no longer recognize the party that he founded" under Fock's leadership. This left the party with only one member in parliament: Torsten Gejl. On 14 November 2020 Fock resigned as the party's leader, leaving Gejl as the ad interim leader until 7 February 2021 where Franciska Rosenkilde became the new official leader.

References

External links 
 Biography on the website of the Danish Parliament (Folketinget)

1965 births
Living people
People from Aarhus
Leaders of political parties in Denmark
The Alternative (Denmark) politicians
21st-century Danish women politicians
Women members of the Folketing
Danish LGBT politicians
Members of the Folketing 2015–2019
20th-century Danish women